Corgatha terracotta is a species of moth of the family Erebidae. It is found in Réunion and Mauritius.

It has a wingspan of approximately 20 mm.

See also
 List of moths of Réunion
 List of moths of Mauritius

References
	

Moths described in 1910
Boletobiinae
Moths of Mauritius
Moths of Réunion